Durhamford Manor is a Grade II* listed country house in the parish of Sedlescombe, East Sussex, England. The timber-framed, close-studded house dates to the early 16th century. The north front features a gable with scalloped bargeboards.

References

Country houses in East Sussex
Grade II* listed houses
Grade II* listed buildings in East Sussex
Sedlescombe